= Huìmìzì =

Character on the Taoist talismans or ritual tools

Huìmìzì (simplified Chinese: 讳秘字; traditional Chinese: 諱秘字; pinyin: Huìmì zì; lit. 'sacral and secret characters') is a type of text commonly found on Taoist talismans or ritual implements. Huì (諱 or 讳) refers to "taboo names," which are the names of respected elders or revered figures. The interpretation of Huìmìzì often relates to nature or divine entities.
